The 25th Star Screen Awards ceremony honoured the best Indian Hindi-language films of 2018. The ceremony was held on 16 December 2018 and broadcast in India on Star Plus on 31 December 2018. Actors Ayushmann Khurrana and Vicky Kaushal hosted the event with comedian Sunil Grover, who hosted the technical awards segment. Additionally, Salman Khan introduced and concluded the awards ceremony.

Raazi led the ceremony with 11 nominations, followed by Andhadhun with 9 nominations and Badhaai Ho, Padmaavat and Stree with 7 nominations each.

Raazi won 6 awards, including Best Actress (for Alia Bhatt), thus becoming the most-awarded film at the ceremony.

Winners and nominees
Winners are listed first and highlighted in boldface.

Main awards

Critics' awards

Special Awards

Technical Awards

Films with multiple nominations and awards

Performers and presenters
The following individuals performed musical numbers or presented awards.

Performers

Presenters

References

Screen Awards